Gabriela Petrova (Bulgarian: Габриела Петрова; born 29 June, 1992 in Haskovo) is a Bulgarian athlete specialising in the triple jump.

Career
She won the silver medal at the 2015 European Indoor Championships in Prague. In addition, she finished fifth at the 2014 European Championships in Zürich.

Her personal bests in the triple jump are 14.66 metres outdoors (Beijing 2015) and 14.55 metres indoors (Dobrich 2015).

Petrova is the holder of a European title for the under 23 age group.

Competition record

References

1992 births
Living people
Bulgarian female triple jumpers
People from Haskovo
World Athletics Championships athletes for Bulgaria
Doping cases in athletics
Bulgarian sportspeople in doping cases
Athletes (track and field) at the 2016 Summer Olympics
Olympic athletes of Bulgaria
Athletes (track and field) at the 2020 Summer Olympics
Sportspeople from Haskovo Province